Undercut may refer to:
Price slashing, a pricing technique designed to eliminate competition
Undercut procedure, a procedure for fair allocation of indivisible objects.
Undercut (boxing), a type of boxing punch
Undercut (film), a stunt people film
Undercut (haircut), a type of bowl haircut
Undercut (manufacturing), a recess that is inaccessible using a straight tool
 Undercut (welding), a defect that reduces the strength of a weld
Undercut (novel), a Peter Niesewand novel
Undercut (road work), excavation work performed in road replacement projects
Undercut (rock climbing), a climbing hold that is pulled on in an upward direction